A Romany Lass is a 1918 British silent drama film directed by F. Martin Thornton and starring James Knight, Marjorie Villis and Bernard Dudley.

Cast
 James Knight as Donald MacLean  
 Marjorie Villis as Rilka  
 Bernard Dudley as Wolf  
 Charles Rock as Colonel MacLean  
 Arthur M. Cullin as Dr. Harris  
 F.G. Thurstans as Reverend Angus MacTavish  
 Adeline Hayden Coffin 
 James Reardon

References

Bibliography
 Low, Rachael. The History of the British Film 1914-1918. Routledge, 2005.

External links

1918 films
1918 drama films
British silent feature films
British drama films
1910s English-language films
Films directed by Floyd Martin Thornton
British black-and-white films
1910s British films
Silent drama films